The North Queensland Razorbacks FC was a football (soccer) club which plays out of Townsville in North Queensland. They played in the Queensland State League. They were considered to be one of two feeder clubs for A-League team North Queensland Fury before its demise in 2011.

History
The club has had reasonable success in the last few years. Before the North Queensland Fury were inducted into the A-League in 2009 the Razorbacks were the sole football team in Townsville and therefore got reasonable crowds in for their home games. However they have become the main feeder club for the Fury. They play their home games at the Murray Sports Reserve and normally play their games on Field 1. In turn the Fury have loaned out several players, including Jacob Timpano to the Razorbacks to gain gametime during the A-League offseason.

In 2010, the NQ Razorbacks played two warm up games against the preseason North Queensland Fury Squad, drawing 0–0 in the first match and then going down 7–2 after being 1–0 up for part of the first half.

Current squad
2012 Queensland State League Squad.

(Captain)

(Vice-Captain)

Staff

 Senior Mens Coach: Ken Mitchell
 Senior Mens Assistant Coach: Troy Perry & Anthony Galliozi
 Senior Men's Team Manager: David Chellingworth
 Senior Mens Goalkeeping Coach: David Chellingworth
 Physiotherapist: Luis Resa
 Sports Trainer: Azra Rantucci
 Operations Manager: Ric Floyd

See also
 Queensland State League

References

External links
 Official website
 Team Profile

Queensland State League soccer teams
Sport in Townsville